Calathus baeticus is a species of ground beetle from the Platyninae subfamily that is endemic to Spain.

References

baeticus
Beetles described in 1837
Endemic fauna of Spain
Beetles of Europe